The Tareen (or Tarin) is a Pashtun tribe inhabiting southern Afghanistan, and western region of Pakistan.

History
Much of the tribe continues to live in their native lands in the southern parts of Afghanistan and Pishin in Baluchistan, Pakistan. During the reign of the Mughal emperor Shah Jahan (1628 to 1658) a group of Tareen/Tarin emigrated to the area which is now the Hazara area of Khyber Pakhtunkhwa province of Pakistan. The Tareen Chiefs resisted the Sikh occupation of Hazara region which resulted in their properties/ land being usurped by Sikh armies.

Branches (Clans)
According to Ni'mat Allah al-Harawi in History of the Afghans, Tareen had three sons namely: Tor, Spin (Aspin or Speen) and Awdal/Born Tareen/Abdali. Their descendants today have adopted the names above as tribal identities and are known as Tor Tareen, Spin Tareen and Bor Tareen. These three major clans are further divided into smaller units.

Languages

The principal languages of Tareen are Tareeno and Pashto and Urdu Punjabi in Pakistan.

Location 
Tareens primarily live in Pishin, Dukki, Loralai, Quetta, Mastung, and Harnai districts of Balochistan, while smaller populations are spread all over the province.

In Khyber Pukhtunkhwa,  the tribe has 'Tareen Vand' in Mardan.  In Haripur, a number of Tareen families claim to have settled there since 1600s, after migrating mainly from Pishin and Kandahar.

Notable people of Tareen descent

 Sardar Bostan Khan (d. 1825) freedom fighter.
 Risaldar Muhammad Habib Khan Tarin, CSI, cavalry officer .
 Abdul Latif Khan Tarin (1884-1916), IDSM, British-Indian Army officer, WWI. 
 Risaldar Mir Dad Khan Tarin, retired cavalry officer and father of late Field Marshal Ayub Khan.
 Field Marshall Ayub Khan (President of Pakistan) (1907-1974) was a Tareen from Pishin(batezai) in Quetta District.
 Sardar Bahadur Khan (1908-1975) Pakistani politician (Chief Minister of Khyber-Pakhtunkhwa)
 Gohar Ayub Khan (b. 1937) Pakistani ex-Army officer, politician and businessman.
 Abdul Majid Khan Tarin, OBE, (1877-1939) Magistrate during British times and MP latter.
 Abdus Salim Khan Tarin, (1907-1957) former Indian and later Pakistani civil servant and diplomat.
 Jehangir Khan Tareen (b. 1953) Pakistani politician and businessman.
 Shaukat Tarin (b. 1953) Pakistani banker and politician.
 Habibullah Khan Tarin (b. 1947) Pakistani army officer and politician.
 Naseer Ahmed Khan Tareen (b. 1936) Pashtun tribal chieftain, social activist and philanthropist
 Jalees Ahmed Khan Tareen (b. 1947) Vice-chancellor of B. S. Abdur Rahman University, former vice-chancellor of Pondicherry University.
 Haris Tarin (b. 1978) Afghan-American, director of the Muslim Public Affairs Council, USA.
 Majrooh Sultanpuri (Asrar ul Hassan Khan Tarin) (1919 - 2000) Indian Urdu poet and film lyricist.
 Nadeem Tarin Indian businessman, philanthropist and educationist settled in Saudi Arabia
 Muhammad Israr Tareen, politician and member of the Pakistani National Assembly. 
 Yousuf Ayub Khan, former politician and a businessman. 
 Omar Ayub Khan,  politician and minister . 
 Akbar Ayub Khan (b. 1971) Member of Parliament from Haripur district, NWFP, Pakistan.

References

Social groups of Pakistan
Ethnic groups in Afghanistan
Pashtun tribes
Sarbani Pashtun tribes
Pakistani names